Ed Byrne is an Irish rugby union player for Leinster Rugby. His preferred position is loosehead prop. In April 2015 he was awarded a senior contract with Leinster following completion of his time in the academy, having previously played with the Leinster senior team, making his debut in February 2014 against Zebre.

Ireland 
In October 2020, he was named in the Ireland squad by coach Andy Farrell for the remaining matches of the 2020 Six Nations Championship. He made his debut as a substitute against Italy on 24 October 2020.

References

External links

Leinster Profile
Pro14 Profile

1993 births
Living people
Rugby union players from County Carlow
People educated at Clongowes Wood College
Irish rugby union players
University College Dublin R.F.C. players
Leinster Rugby players
Rugby union props
Ireland international rugby union players